Leo M. Birmingham (April 14, 1893 – January 15, 1936) was an American businessman and politician.

Birmingham was born in Boston, Massachusetts, in the Brighton neighborhood. He graduated from the Boston College High School. In 1915, he graduated from Boston College. He served in World War I as a U.S. Navy ensign. He worked for the New England Telephone and Telegraph Company. Birmingham then owned a funeral home in Brighton. He served in the Massachusetts House of Representatives from 1925 until his death in 1936. Birmingham was a Democrat. Birmingham was elected House Democratic Floor Leader in 1929, a position he held until 1934. He died at his home in Brighton after a long illness. Shortly after his death, the House voted to rename Soldier's Field Road Extension as the Leo M. Birmingham Parkway in Brighton.

See also
 Massachusetts legislature: 1925–1926, 1927–1928, 1929–1930, 1931–1932, 1933–1934, 1935–1936

Notes

1893 births
1936 deaths
Businesspeople from Boston
Politicians from Boston
Boston College High School alumni
Boston College alumni
American funeral directors
Democratic Party members of the Massachusetts House of Representatives
20th-century American politicians
20th-century American businesspeople